Günther Schack (12 November 1917 – 14 June 2003) was a German Luftwaffe military aviator during World War II and a fighter ace credited with 174 enemy aircraft shot down in 780 combat missions. All of his victories were claimed on the Eastern Front.

Born in Bartenstein in Eastern Prussia, Schack joined the military service in the Luftwaffe of Nazi Germany in 1939. Following flight training, he was posted to 7. Staffel (squadron) of Jagdgeschwader 51 (JG 51—51st Fighter Wing). He claimed his first aerial victory on 23 July 1941 during Operation Barbarossa, the German invasion of the Soviet Union. In April 1943, he was posted to fighter pilot training, returning to the Eastern Front in July. He claimed his 100th aerial victory in September and was awarded the Knight's Cross of the Iron Cross on 29 October 1943. Schack was appointed Staffelkapitän (squadron leader) of 9. Staffel and received the Knight's Cross of the Iron Cross with Oak Leaves on 20 April 1944 following 133 aerial victories. In December 1944, he was appointed Gruppenkommandeur (group commander) of the I. Gruppe (1st group) of JG 51 "Mölders". This unit was disbanded in April 1945. He then briefly took command of IV. (Sturm) Gruppe of Jagdgeschwader 3 "Udet" (JG 3—3rd Fighter Wing) which he led until the end of World War 2 in Europe.

After the war he lived secluded in the Eifel Mountains, and devoted himself to philosophical research and died on 14 June 2003 in Schmidt, Nideggen.

Early life
Schack was born on 12 November 1917 in Bartenstein, at the time in Eastern Prussia of the German Empire, present-day Bartoszyce in the Warmian-Masurian Voivodeship, He was the son of an Superintendent. Following graduation from school, Schack studied metallurgy at the University of Stuttgart and at the Rheinisch-Westfälische Technische Hochschule in Aachen. In 1937, he attempted to join the Luftwaffe but was categorised as wehruntauglich (unsuited for military service) because of a sports injury earlier in his life. On Friday 1 September 1939 German forces invaded Poland which marked the beginning of World War II. The next day, Schack again volunteered for military service and was accepted.

World War II
Following flight training as a fighter pilot, Gefreiter (Privat First Class) Schack was posted to 7. Staffel (squadron) of Jagdgeschwader 51 (JG 51—51st Fighter Wing) on 18 March 1941. At the time, III. Gruppe of JG 51, to which 7. Staffel was subordinated, was based at Saint-Omer in Northern France. The Gruppe was equipped with the Messerschmitt Bf 109 F-1 and commanded by Hauptmann (Captain) Richard Leppla and fought against the Royal Air Force over the English Channel. The unit was withdrawn from France on 26 May 1941 and moved to Düsseldorf where it was replenished with the Bf 109 F-2 and waited for further orders.

Eastern Front

By 15 June, JG 51 had completed its preparation for Operation Barbarossa, the German invasion of the Soviet Union and was based at airfields at Siedlce, Stara Wieś, Halasy where III. Gruppe was based and Krzewica, close to the German–Soviet demarcation line. The attack on the Soviet Union began at 03:45 on 22 June with JG 51 flying fighter patrols along the Bug River. The German advance into the Soviet Union required constant relocation of III. Gruppe. Flying from Orsha, Schack claimed his first aerial victory on 23 July 1941 during the Battle of Smolensk. That day he shot down a Tupolev SB bomber northeast of Babruysk, and received the Iron Cross 2nd Class on 10 August 1941.

In October 1941, German forces launched the strategic offensive named Operation Typhoon which resulted in the Battle of Moscow. Schack claimed his second victory during this offensive when he shot down a Petlyakov Pe-2 bomber northeast of Yukhnov. On 23 October, he bailed out of his burning Bf 109 F-2 (Werknummer 9189—factory number) following aerial combat near Ugoskosawed which is in the vicinity of Kaluga. He achieved his third air victory after 100 combat missions, on 10 November 1941. On 30 July 1942, he flew his 250th combat mission. That day, he also damaged Bf 109 F-2 (Werknummer 8117) in a ground collision during an emergency takeoff at Dugino in the Novoduginsky District. In October, III Gruppe predominantly flew combat air patrols in the vicinity of Rzhev where the German 9th Army was deployed. Schack claimed his 18th aerial victory on 15 October, an Ilyushin Il-2 ground attack aircraft shot down west of Bely.

On 10 November 1942, III. Gruppe received the order to convert to the Focke-Wulf Fw 190 at Jesau, present-day Juschny, located southeast of Königsberg. Because Luftwaffe units were already stretched in the combat area of Army Group Center, fighting in the Battles of Rzhev, conversion was done in rotation, one squadron at a time. The first units converted were the Gruppenstab (headquarters unit) and 7. Staffel while 8. and 9. Staffel were still engaged over the left flank of Army Group Center. In total, III. Gruppe received a complement of 41 Fw 190 A-2s and Fw 190 A-3s. On 16 December, first elements of 7. Staffel arrived at Dugino. The next day, on his first mission on the Fw 190, Schack shot down five Soviet Pe-2 bombers in the vicinity of Sychyovka, making him an "ace-in-a-day" for the first time. Six weeks later, on 29 January 1943, Schack almost repeated this when his Schwarm (flight of four aircraft), on a Junkers Ju 87 escort mission, encountered eight Soviet Pe-2 flying in a line astern crossing the German lines at Novosil. Within five minutes all eight were shot down including four by Schack.

Operating from the airfield at Oryol-West, equipped with heated hangars and buildings, III. Gruppe was tasked with operating in the airspace south and east of Oryol. On 23 February, Schack for the second time became an "ace-in-a-day", claiming five aerial victories in the vicinity of Zhizdra. That day, he shot down an Il-2 ground attack aircraft on an early morning mission followed by a Lavochkin La-5 fighter at 09:33. Shortly after noon, he claimed three Lavochkin-Gorbunov-Gudkov LaGG-3 fighters.  Schack, who had been promoted to Leutnant (Second Lieutenant) on 1 January 1943, was awarded the German Cross in Gold on 26 February 1943. On 1 April 1943, he was transferred to Ergänzungs-Jagdgruppe Ost, a supplementary training unit, where served as a flight instructor, sharing his combat experience with new fighter pilots destined for the Eastern Front.

Schack returned to the front on 5 July 1943, this time posted to 8. Staffel of JG 51, a squadron also subordinated to III. Gruppe. The date of Schack's posting to 8. Staffel coincides with the start of the German offensive Operation Citadel as part of the Battle of Kursk. In this operation, III. Gruppe was tasked with supporting 9th Army on the northern flank of the offensive. On 12 July, Soviet forces launched Operation Kutuzov, the northern offensive, with its objective being to collapse the Oryol salient, cut behind the 9th Army engaged in offensive operations at Kursk, encircle and annihilate it. On 15 July, rain impacted aerial operations and III. Gruppe flew its first missions in the early afternoon in the vicinity north of the Oryol salient. The Gruppe encountered a number of Soviet LaGG-3, Yakovlev Yak-1 and Mikoyan-Gurevich MiG-3 fighter aircraft north of Bolkhov. In this encounter, III. Gruppe claimed five aerial victories including three by Schack. Later that day, the Gruppe escorted Ju-87 to the vicinity of Archangelskoje east of Oryol. On that mission, Schack claimed a La-5 shot down. Based at Bryansk, Schack flew three combat missions on 21 July 1943. He did not claim any aerial victories on the first and second mission of the day. On the third mission which began at 19:15, he encountered La-5s north-east of Zhizdra and claimed one La-5 shot down. According to Bergström, this claim was his 56th aerial victory while Mathews and Foreman list this claim as his 54th victory. In total, he claimed 10 victories in July and then a further 40 in August.

Squadron leader
On 20 August 1943, Schack was transferred again to 7. Staffel and was temporarily put in charge of this squadron as acting Staffelführer (squadron leader). He replaced Oberleutnant (First Lieutenant) Karl-Heinz Weber in this capacity who returned to retake command of 7. Staffel on 15 October. In August 1943, four different aircraft flown by Schack sustained various degrees of combat damage. On 3 August, he crash landed his Fw 190 A southwest of Oryol following aerial combat. Two days later, his Fw 190 A-6 (Werknummer 530315) sustained heavy damage in aerial combat. On 15 August, Schack flew Fw 190 A-4 (Werknummer 5724) which was hit by Soviet anti-aircraft artillery near Spas-Demensk. Fw 190 A (Werknummer 7330) was hit by friendly fire on 28 August resulting in a forced landing at Glukhov.

Flying from Konotop on 3 September, Schack escorted Ju 87 dive bombers on their mission to attack Soviet forces in southeast of Sevsk, west of Kursk. That day III. Gruppe claimed four aerial victories, including a La-5 fighter shot down by Schack east of Glukhov. This claim was reported as his 100th aerial victory. He was the 52nd Luftwaffe pilot to achieve the century-mark. On 26 October, he was awarded the Knight's Cross of the Iron Cross for 116 victories. On 9 December 1943, promoted to Oberleutnant, Schack was officially given command of 9. Staffel of JG 51 as Staffelkapitän, replacing Oberleutnant Maximilian Mayerl who was transferred.

1944 saw the German forces pushed inexorably out of Russia and III. Gruppe of JG 51 covered the retreat of Army Group Centre, moving from Orsha to Terespol then back to Minsk and Kaunus, with Schack scoring consistently. On 16 January, he was shot down by Soviet fighters in a Fw 190 A southeast of Babruysk. Schack was awarded the Knight's Cross of the Iron Cross with Oak Leaves on 20 April 1944 for 133 aerial victories. The presentation was made by Adolf Hitler at the Berghof, Hitler's residence in the Obersalzberg of the Bavarian Alps, on 5 May 1944. Also present at the ceremony were Anton Hafner, Otto Kittel, Emil Lang, Alfred Grislawski, Erich Rudorffer, Martin Möbus, Wilhelm Herget, Hans-Karl Stepp, Rudolf Schoenert, Günther Radusch, Otto Pollmann and Fritz Breithaupt, who all received the Oak Leaves on this date. On 1 July 1944, Schack was promoted to Hauptmann. On 6 August, he was shot down in his Bf 109 G-6 by North American P-51 Mustang fighters behind enemy lines. On 13 August, Schack became the 28th pilot to claim 150 aerial victories. On 6 October 1944, Schack bailed out from Bf 109 G-6 (Werknummer 165559), the fourth time he was forced to save his life by parachute.

Group commander
On 16 December 1944, Schack was appointed Gruppenkommandeur (group commander) of the I. Gruppe (1st group) of JG 51 "Mölders", taking command of this unit on 29 December. Schack thus succeeded Major (Major) Erich Leie who was given the position of Geschwaderkommodore of Jagdgeschwader 77 (JG 77—77th Fighter Wing). Command of 9. Staffel was passed on to Leutnant Ludwig Strobel. At the time, I. Gruppe was located on various airfields in West Prussia and fighting in the Courland Pocket and was subordinated to Luftflotte 6 (Air Fleet 6). On 23 January 1945, I. and IV. Gruppe moved to an airfield at Danzig-Langfuhr, present-day Wrzeszcz, where the two units were resupplied with new but largely young and inexperienced pilots. At Danzig-Langfuhr, I. Gruppe was placed under the control of II. Fliegerkorps (2nd Air Corps) and fought in support of the evacuation of East Prussia. Because of fuel shortage, Schack was never able to fly missions with more than a few aircraft at a time. This created the impression with the Luftflotte that JG 51 was overstaffed and ordered personnel to be transferred to the infantry. This was a misinterpretation, surplus pilots had been transferred to III. Gruppe which had sustained heavy casualties. Nevertheless, Oberst (Colonel) Otto Weiß, at the time Jagdfliegerführer Westpreußen (commander of the fighter forces of a Luftflotte), threatened Schack with court-martial for failing to comply with an order. From February to early March, I. Gruppe area of operations was predominantly the area of Elbing, present-day Elbląg. Sources vary with respect to the number of aerial victories Schack claimed following his appointment to Gruppenkommandeur. According to Mathews and Foreman, Schack claimed nine aerial victories which includes his 174th and final victory claimed on 7 April 1945. According to Obermaier, Schack claimed thirteen further victories before reaching his total of 174 aerial victories on 7 April 1945.

On 24 March, the airfield at Danzig-Langfuhr came under Soviet artillery attack, killing four and wounding many more. Schack, as a native East Prussian and familiar with area, led the ground personnel, towing 40 Bf 109 aircraft of which ten were still serviceable after the trek arrived in Brüsterort. On 12 April 1945, I. Gruppe had one serviceable aircraft remaining in which Schack had to bail out following aerial combat. He suffered serious burns and had to be flown out. Soon after, in late April, the Gruppe was disbanded. On 1 May, Schack was still recovering from his injuries sustained on 12 April, he was named commander of IV. (Sturm) Gruppe of Jagdgeschwader 3 "Udet" (JG 3—3rd Fighter Wing). At the time, the Gruppe was based at Rerik. On 2 May, Schack ordered the retreat of IV. (Sturm) Gruppe remnants to Westerland on the island of Sylt. On 4 May, all German forces in northwest Germany including all islands surrendered. The Gruppe remained in Westerland until 20 June when they were brought to the internment camp at Hennstedt.

Later life
Schack was once shot down by Lieutenant Hollis "Bud" Nowlin of the 357th Fighter Group over East Prussia. Nowlin and Schack met again first in Germany and then again in the fall of 1991 at the 357th Fighter Group reunion in Georgia.

Summary of career

Aerial victory claims
According to US historian David T. Zabecki, Schack was credited with 174 aerial victories. Spick also lists him with 174 aerial victories claimed in 780 combat missions, all of which on the Eastern Front. Mathews and Foreman, authors of Luftwaffe Aces — Biographies and Victory Claims, researched the German Federal Archives and state that Schack was credited with more than 174 aerial victories, all of which claimed on the Eastern Front.

Victory claims were logged to a map-reference (PQ = Planquadrat), for example "PQ 47593". These sectors were then subdivided into 36 smaller units to give a location area 3 × 4 km in size.

Awards
 Iron Cross (1939)
 2nd Class (10 August 1941)
 1st Class (15 June 1942)
 Honour Goblet of the Luftwaffe on 25 January 1943 as Feldwebel and pilot
 German Cross in Gold on 26 February 1943 as Feldwebel in the III./Jagdgeschwader 51
 Knight's Cross of the Iron Cross with Oak Leaves
 Knight's Cross on 29 October 1943 as Leutnant (war officer) and pilot in the 9./Jagdgeschwader 51 "Mölders"
 460th Oak Leaves on 20 April 1944 as Leutnant (war officer) and Staffelkapitän of the 9./Jagdgeschwader 51 "Mölders"

Works 
 Schack, Günther (1995). Betet für die Juden, betet für die Christen [Pray for the Jews, pray for the Christians]. Nideggen. .
 Schack, Günther (1975). Die Homokratie im Erdkreis [The Homocracy on the Globe]. 
 Schack, Günther (1975). Die Homokratie im Lebenskreis [The Homocracy in the Circle of Life]. 
 Schack, Günther (1975). Die Homokratie im Völkerkreis [The Homocracy in the Circle of People].

Notes

References

Citations

Bibliography

 
 
 
 
 
 
 
 
 
 
 
 
 
 
 
 
 
 
 
 
 
 
 
 
 

1917 births
2003 deaths
People from Bartoszyce
People from East Prussia
Luftwaffe pilots
German World War II flying aces
Recipients of the Gold German Cross
Recipients of the Knight's Cross of the Iron Cross with Oak Leaves
University of Stuttgart alumni